The Church of the Madonna della Difesa is a Catholic church in the neighbourhood of Little Italy in Montreal, Quebec, Canada. It was built by Italian immigrants to the city, specifically those from Molise, to commemorate the apparition of the Madonna in La Difesa, in Casacalenda, Molise. It was designed by Roch Montbriant and Canadian artist Guido Nincheri. It is Romanesque in style and laid out in a Greek-cross floorplan. It was inaugurated in 1919.

It is famous for its large cupola and brick façade, and especially its frescos by Guido Nincheri. A particularly well-known fresco depicts Benito Mussolini; painted before World War II, it commemorates his signing of the Lateran Accords. A statue in front of the church commemorates "victims of all wars."

Designated a National Historic Site of Canada in 2002, 
it is located at 6800 Henri-Julien Avenue at the corner of Dante Street (Jean-Talon or Beaubien metro stations) in the borough of Rosemont—La Petite-Patrie. Plaqued in 2005, the Church serves the oldest Italian community in Canada.

Three priests serve at the church; all are members of the Priestly Fraternity of the Missionaries of St.Charles Borromeo.

References

External links

Parish site
Historic site designation
360 degree virtual tour of the church 

Italian diaspora in Canada
Christian organizations established in 1919
M
Landmarks in Montreal
National Historic Sites in Quebec
Roman Catholic churches completed in 1919
20th-century Roman Catholic church buildings in Canada
Rosemont–La Petite-Patrie
Roman Catholic churches on the National Historic Sites of Canada register
Romanesque Revival church buildings in Canada